This Is Donovan is a compilation album from Scottish singer-songwriter Donovan. Some sources date the album from 1969, while others claim it was released in West Germany (Epic Records BN 26 277) in 1971 and in the Netherlands (Epic Records LP – S 66 251) in 1974.

History
Epic Records compiled many Donovan songs that did not appear on Donovan's Greatest Hits into a two record set titled This Is Donovan for the continental European market.  Epic would later assemble a similar release as The World of Donovan tailored to fit the United States market.

Track listing
All tracks by Donovan Leitch, except where noted.

Side one

"Under the Greenwood Tree" (words by William Shakespeare, music by Donovan Leitch)
"Writer in the Sun"
"Sand and Foam"
"Ferris Wheel"
"As I Recall It"
"Three King Fishers"

Side two

"Laleña"
"Little Boy in Corduroy"
"Isle of Islay"
"The River Song"
"The Sun Is a Very Magic Fellow"
"Hampstead Incident"

Side three

"There is a Mountain"
"Happiness Runs"
"West Indian Lady"
"The Enchanted Gypsy"
"Sunny South Kensington"
"Young Girl Blues"

Side four

"Someone Singing"
"Where Is She"
"The Land of Doesn't Have to Be"
"Celeste"
"Mad John's Escape"
"Catch the Wind"

Albums produced by Mickie Most
1969 compilation albums
Donovan compilation albums
Epic Records compilation albums